Collegelands is part of a £200m development project in the heart of the city of Glasgow, Scotland. It is one of the largest regeneration projects in the United Kingdom. It was opened in 2012.

The location, which near to the first buildings of the University of Glasgow, takes up 1.1m square feet on the corner of Duke Street and High Street. Collegelands, latterly known as the College Goods Railway Yard, is Glasgow's first new city centre quarter in several years. The margin wall of the former College Goods Yard railway station on Duke Street has been reserved, in affirmation to the history of the site. The existing High Street railway station is directly to the west of the development.

The development has been created through a partnership between Glasgow City Council and Watkin Dawn Group. The city's economy was impacted by over £80million during the first phase of Collegelands, as over 400 construction jobs were created.

This development comprises 588 student study bedrooms including 565 en-suite bedrooms and 23 self-contained studio flats over nine storeys, with some ground floor retail units. Within the buildings footmark two courtyards were formed. It is situated on Havannah Street. Collegelands accommodates over 400 undergraduate and postgraduate University of Strathclyde students.

The facility is managed by Fresh Student Living which houses over 12,000 students in over 40 university and college locations across the UK.

The development has attracted criticism from commentators for its unremarkable construction style in an area of high local aesthetic and historic value.

References 

Buildings and structures in Glasgow
Halls of residence in the United Kingdom
2012 establishments in Scotland
Areas of Glasgow